Anna Song may refer to:

 Anna Song (politician), American politician
 Anna Canzano, American television journalist, formerly known as Anna Song
 Anna (Go to Him), a 1963 Arthur Alexander song covered by the Beatles